My Pal Gus is a 1952 comedy-drama film which follows Gus (George Winslow), the young son of divorced industrialist Dave Jennings (Richard Widmark). Unable to cope with Gus' mischievous streak, Jennings places the boy in a day-care center. Gus' teacher Lydia Marble (Joanne Dru) manages to curb the boy's prankishness, and along the way falls in love with Jennings. Enter the villainess of the piece: Jennings' ex-wife Joyce (Audrey Totter), who claims that the divorce is invalid and demands a huge sum from Jennings, lest she claim custody of Gus.

The film was officially dubbed My Pal Gus in August 1952. Prior to that, four different pre-release titles had been announced—in order of appearance, How High Is Up?, The Problem Is Love, Big Man, and Top Man. The next-to-last of these would reemerge in December to play a prominent part in the film's advertising campaign.

Plot
Dave Jennings is so focused on his Los Angeles-based business that he neglects his precocious five-year-old son Gus, who is constantly creating havoc in order to get his father's attention. After Gus's latest escapade is cleaned up and paid for, Dave orders his long-suffering secretary, Ivy Tolliver, to find a new nurse for Gus, then leaves on a business trip. Upon his return, Dave learns that Ivy has placed Gus in the Playtime School, and that he must meet with the teacher, Lydia Marble, to enroll Gus formally. Rushed as usual, Dave tells the attractive Lydia that he will pay whatever it takes to keep Gus in line, but when Lydia explains that parents are required to participate in their child's education at Playtime, Dave indignantly states that he knows all he needs to about Gus. Dave is amazed by how well Gus responds to Lydia's instructions, however, after he smacks a schoolmate. Believing that Gus can benefit from Lydia's tutelage, Dave agrees to keep him at Playtime. As the next three weeks pass, Gus becomes contented and well-behaved, but on Dave's scheduled parent participation day, the businessman instead sends a truckload of toys to the school. Lydia returns the toys with a note admonishing Dave that as a substitute for his attention, the toys are not enough, and when Dave comes to the school to protest, Lydia assumes that he is there to help.

Dave tells Lydia that he has fallen in love with her, and although Lydia returns Dave's affections, she tells him that his feelings stem from his dependence upon her for help with Gus. That night, Dave comforts a frightened Gus by allowing him to sleep in his bed, and, realizing that he no longer needs Lydia for instruction on child care, confronts her with his new knowledge. Secure that Dave does indeed love her for herself, Lydia enjoys his embrace. As time passes, Dave becomes a devoted father, and his romance with Lydia blossoms into an engagement. On Gus's birthday, however, Joyce, Dave's ex-wife, appears and asks Dave to visit her at her hotel. Fearing the worst, Dave keeps the appointment and discovers that the money-grubbing, immoral Joyce is broke and claims that their Mexican divorce is not legal. Dave's lawyer, Farley Norris, confirms the upsetting news, but Dave, infuriated by Joyce's reappearance, refuses to give her money to obtain a legal divorce.

Determined to win, no matter what is revealed about Joyce in court, Dave does not listen to the pleas of his friends that he think of Gus and end the confrontation quietly. Dave instead hires private detectives to gather ammunition against Joyce until the day before the trial begins. Needing a rest, Dave drives to his new beach house and spends the night. Unknown to Dave, Lydia and Gus have also spent the night there, and in court the next day, Joyce's lawyer charges Dave with adultery and names Lydia as the co-respondent. The resulting publicity horrifies Lydia, and she is forced to close her school. Lydia confronts Dave, accusing him of caring more about his fortune than about his son, and breaks their engagement. As the trial continues, Farley proves that Joyce abandoned Dave, and the judge upholds Dave's request for a divorce. Although he does not award Joyce any of Dave's property, the judge, sickened by Dave's tactics, grants Joyce custody of Gus. Dave is heartbroken, and on the morning that he drives Gus to Joyce's hotel, is overcome when Gus pleads to remain with him. Realizing that Gus is more important to him than anything else, Dave marches to Joyce's room and agrees to give her everything he owns in exchange for permanent custody of Gus. As he returns to the car, Dave is met by Lydia, who promises to help him fight for his son. Assuring her that the matter is settled, Dave embraces Lydia and Gus, then asks Lydia if she can pay for lunch.

Cast

References

External links
 

1952 films
1952 comedy-drama films
American comedy-drama films
20th Century Fox films
Films about educators
Films directed by Robert Parrish
American black-and-white films
1950s English-language films
1950s American films
English-language comedy-drama films